Dundarg Castle is a ruined castle about  north-northeast of New Aberdour, Aberdeenshire, Scotland, built within the ramparts of an earlier Iron Age promontory fort. It was described by W. Douglas Simpson as one of the nine castles of the Knuckle, referring to the rocky headland of North-East Aberdeenshire, and by Charles McKean as "Scotland's answer to Tintagel". It became a small Celtic monastery for a period.

Structure

Its name comes from the Gaelic dun dearg, meaning red fort or castle, referring to the colour of the sandstone.

History

The 6th-century Book of Deer records the existence of a cathair or fortified place at Aberdour.

It was built in the 13th century by the Comyn family, but was dismantled, probably by Robert the Bruce, in 1308. It was rebuilt in 1334 by Henry de Beaumont, but slighted almost immediately, after a famous siege by Sir Andrew Moray. Many medieval objects providing evidence of this double destruction were found in excavations in 1911-12 and 1950-51, led by W. Douglas Simpson.

The upper part was rebuilt in the middle of the 16th century, probably following the Coastal Defence Commission of 1550, and there is some evidence that it was provided with gunloops at that time. The site was finally abandoned in the mid-17th century. A house was built on part of the site in 1938, reputedly by and for Wing Commander David Vaughan Carnegie, using stone from the former Aberdour Free Church.

The castle and promontory fort are protected as a scheduled monument, while the modern house is a category B listed building.

References

Bibliography
 
 
 
 
 Simpson, W. D. (1954) Dundarg Castle. Aberdeen University.
 Simpson, W. D. (1960) 'Dundarg Castle reconsidered', Transactions of the Buchan Field Club 17(4), pp. 9–25.

History of Aberdeenshire
Castles in Aberdeenshire
Promontory forts in Scotland
Former castles in Scotland
Category B listed buildings in Aberdeenshire
Listed houses in Scotland
Ruined castles in Aberdeenshire
Former Christian monasteries in Scotland
Scheduled Ancient Monuments in Aberdeenshire
Clan Comyn